Michael Smyth (27 April 1921 – 7 May 1981) was an Irish trade unionist and Labour Party politician.  He was Mayor of Galway from 1971 to 1972.

Smyth was one of six children born to Patrick Smyth and Barbara Crowley of Prospect Hill, Galway City. He was a shop steward in the Irish Transport and General Workers' Union, and in 1963 became a founder member of the city's first credit union, St. Columba's Credit Union Limited, Mervue. He was to continue working for the Credit Union for the rest of his life. He was a member, and later chairman, of the Trades Council, joined the Labour Party in the 1950s, later becoming a member of its constituency council.

Smyth was elected to Galway Corporation in the early 1960s and was elected Mayor on 5 July 1971. It was under his auspices that the first Mayoral Ball was held, at Seapoint, Salthill, on 29 February 1872. At his instigation, cross-border holidays were held for children from Derry, a city he visited while Mayor.

He did not seek re-election to the council in June 1974.

References
 Role of Honour: The Mayors of Galway City 1485-2001, William Henry, Galway, 2001.

External links
 https://web.archive.org/web/20071119083053/http://www.galwaycity.ie/AllServices/YourCouncil/HistoryofTheCityCouncil/PreviousMayors/

Politicians from County Galway
Mayors of Galway
1921 births
1981 deaths
Labour Party (Ireland) politicians
Irish trade unionists